Maximum Velocity (V-Max) is a 2002 Italian drama film directed by Daniele Vicari. It entered the competition at the 59th Venice International Film Festival.

For this film Vicari won the 2003 David di Donatello for best new director.  The film also won two Nastro d'Argento Awards, for best producer and best editing.

Plot

Cast 
 Valerio Mastandrea: Stefano
 Cristiano Morroni: Claudio
 Alessia Barela: Giovanna
 Ivano De Matteo: Fischio
 Ennio Girolami: Father of Stefano
 Sara Franchetti: Mother of Stefano
 Isabella Orsini: Actress

See also
List of Italian films of 2002

References

External links

2002 films
Italian drama films
2002 drama films
Films directed by Daniele Vicari
2002 directorial debut films
2000s Italian films